Meskiagnun, also Mesh-ki-ang-Nanna  (mes-ki-ag₂-nun, also), was the fourth lugal or king of the First Dynasty of Ur, according to the Sumerian King List, which states he ruled for 36 years.

Bowl dedication
Meskiagnun is mentioned in two bowl dedications by his wife Gan-Saman, with the same inscription:

Records of temple dedication to the gods in the Tummal inscription
He is also mentioned in the Tummal Inscription with his father Mesannepada, as restoring the Tummal shrine to Enlil and Ninlil in Nippur after it had "fallen into ruin":

Chronological discrepancies

Tummal inscription attests to a relative date for Meskiagnun and his father between Enmebaragesi and Gilgamesh, whereas the Sumerian King List dates the father and son pair generations after Enmebaragesi and Gilgamesh. Samuel Noah Kramer notes that this raises "a chronological problem which cannot be resolved for the present." Meskiagnun is mentioned as follows in the Sumerian King List:

References

|-

Sumerian kings
26th-century BC Sumerian kings
First Dynasty of Ur